Woodvale Football Club is a Northern Irish, intermediate football club playing in Division 1C of the Northern Amateur Football League. The club is based in Belfast, and was formed in 1990 as 99th BB Old Boys. The club plays in the Irish Cup.

Honours

Junior honours
Irish Junior Cup: 1
2010-11

References

External links
 Club website

Association football clubs in Northern Ireland
Association football clubs established in 1990
Association football clubs in Belfast
Northern Amateur Football League clubs
1990 establishments in Northern Ireland